The 1965 NCAA Men's University Division Ice Hockey Tournament was the culmination of the 1964–65 NCAA University Division men's ice hockey season, the 18th such tournament in NCAA history. It was held between March 18 and 20, 1965, and concluded with Michigan Tech defeating Boston College 8-2. All games were played at the Meehan Auditorium in Providence, Rhode Island.

This is the first time the NCAA tournament did not have a participant that appeared in the previous season's meeting.

Qualifying teams
Four teams qualified for the tournament, two each from the eastern and western regions. The ECAC tournament champion and the WCHA tournament champion received automatic bids into the tournament. Two at-large bids were offered to one eastern and one western team based upon both their tournament finish as well as their regular season record.

Format
The ECAC champion was seeded as the top eastern team while the WCHA champion was given the top western seed. The second eastern seed was slotted to play the top western seed and vice versa. All games were played at the Meehan Auditorium. All matches were Single-game eliminations with the semifinal winners advancing to the national championship game and the losers playing in a consolation game.

Bracket

Note: * denotes overtime period(s)

Semifinals

Boston College vs. North Dakota

Michigan Tech vs. Brown

Consolation Game

North Dakota vs. Brown

National Championship

Boston College vs. Michigan Tech

All-Tournament team

First Team
G: Tony Esposito (Michigan Tech)
D: Dennis Huculak (Michigan Tech)
D: Pete Leiman (Michigan Tech)
F: John Cunniff (Boston College)
F: Gary Milroy* (Michigan Tech)
F: Wayne Weller (Michigan Tech)
* Most Outstanding Player(s)

Second Team
G: Pat Murphy (Boston College)
D: Roy Davidson (North Dakota)
D: Ralph Toran (Boston College)
F: Gerry Kell (North Dakota)
F: Bob Stoyko (North Dakota)
F: Dennis Macks (Brown)

References

Tournament
NCAA Division I men's ice hockey tournament
NCAA University Division Men's Ice Hockey Tournament
NCAA University Division Men's Ice Hockey Tournament
Ice hockey competitions in Providence, Rhode Island